Didio or DiDio is a surname. Notable people with the surname include:

Mark Didio (born 1969), American football player
Marisa Didio (born 1956), American field hockey coach
Dan DiDio (born 1959), American writer, editor, and publisher

See also
Palmiro Di Dio (born 1985), Italian footballer